Sungai Udang is a state constituency in Malacca, Malaysia, that has been represented in the Malacca State Legislative Assembly.

The state constituency was first contested in 1974 and is mandated to return a single Assemblyman to the Melaka State Legislative Assembly under the first-past-the-post voting system. , the State Assemblyman for Sungai Udang is Mohd Aleef Yusof from Perikatan Nasional (PN).

Definition
The Sungai Udang constituency contains the polling districts of Bukit Terendak, Pekan Sungai Udang, Paya Rumput Jaya and Bertam Hulu.

Demographics

History

Polling districts
According to the gazette issued on 31 October 2022, the Sungai Udang constituency has a total of 4 polling districts.

Representation history

Election results
The electoral results for the Sungai Udang state constituency in 2004, 2008, 2013 and 2018 are as follows.

References

Malacca state constituencies